Dahab Island (or: Gazirat edh-Dhahab, Arabic: جزيرة الذهب, Ǧazīrat aḏ-Ḏahab, "Island of Gold") is a Nile island located in the metropolitan region of Cairo near the eastern Nile shore south of Roda Island and near of Qorsaya Island. The island belongs to Giza and has a strong agricultural character.

The  Dahab Island is inhabited by roughly 11,000 fishermen and farmers. The island is accessed by ferry.

There is an open conflict between the island residents and the Cairo-development plan of the Egyptian government.

References

Islands of the Nile
River islands of Egypt
Giza